Proteinase A may refer to:
 Streptogrisin A, an enzyme
 Aspergillopepsin II, an enzyme
 Saccharopepsin, an enzyme